Peter Hinwood (born 17 May 1946) is an English antiques dealer and former actor. He is best known for his role as Rocky in The Rocky Horror Picture Show in 1975.

Biography
Hinwood worked as both a photographer and a professional model while he was pursuing his acting career. Hinwood is mostly noted for his film appearance as the well-oiled, muscular and mostly mute creation Rocky in the 1975 cult classic, The Rocky Horror Picture Show. Rocky's singing voice was dubbed in post-production by Australian singer Trevor White. Both Hinwood and White were interviewed by Scott Michaels for his 2002 book Rocky Horror: From Concept to Cult.

His portrayal of Dr. Frank-N-Furter's "creation" was the most significant role of Hinwood's limited acting career. Hinwood had played the Greek god Hermes in the Adventures of Ulysses mini-series on British television in the late 1960s. He performed in one other horror film before Rocky Horror, as "Guy" in Roddy McDowall's macabre Tam Lin. After Rocky Horror, he capped his cinematic career with a bit role in Paul Humfress and Derek Jarman's homoerotic Roman historical drama, Sebastiane.

Hinwood is now an antiques dealer in London and lives most of the time in Tangier. He told People magazine in 2000 that there were three reasons why he chose not to continue to milk his Horror moment. "One, I can't act. Two, I cringe with embarrassment every time I see myself on film. Three, I relish a quiet, peaceful life." Hinwood revealed that in 1994 he had rediscovered the gold hot pants he wore in the film and sold them through an auction house for nearly US$1,000. They are now part of the Hard Rock memorabilia collection, and were for a time displayed in their Myrtle Beach, South Carolina, restaurant. The shorts can be viewed at the Orlando Hard Rock.

Personal life
His "life and business partner" was Christopher Gibbs, antiques dealer and collector, until Gibbs' death in July 2018.

Filmography

References

External links
 
 

1946 births
English male film actors
English antiquarians
Living people
Place of birth missing (living people)
English gay actors
English LGBT actors
English male models